Fayette Township is a township in Decatur County, Iowa, USA.  As of the 2000 census, its population was 185.

Geography
Fayette Township covers an area of 23.16 square miles (59.99 square kilometers); of this, 0.21 square miles (0.53 square kilometers) or 0.88 percent is water. The stream of Sevenmile Creek runs through this township.

Adjacent townships
 Bloomington Township (north)
 Burrell Township (northeast)
 Lamoni Township (northeast)
 New Buda Township (east)
 Riley Township, Ringgold County (west)
 Athens Township, Ringgold County (northwest)

Cemeteries
The township contains two cemeteries: Hollen and Sweet Home.

Major highways
 Interstate 35
 U.S. Route 69

Airports and landing strips
 Lamoni Municipal Airport

References
 U.S. Board on Geographic Names (GNIS)
 United States Census Bureau cartographic boundary files

External links
 US-Counties.com
 City-Data.com

Townships in Decatur County, Iowa
Townships in Iowa